Uttendorf is a municipality in the district of Zell am See (Pinzgau region), in the state of Salzburg in Austria.

Population

Climate
The Köppen Climate Classification sub-type for this climate is "ET" (Tundra Climate).

References

Cities and towns in Zell am See District
Kitzbühel Alps
Glockner Group
Granatspitze Group